The 2015–16 Liga Nacional de Ascenso de Honduras season is divided into two tournaments named Apertura and Clausura.  The Liga Nacional de Ascenso de Honduras is the second-tier football league of Honduras and decides the team to be promoted to the 2016–17 Honduran Liga Nacional.

Clausura

Standings

Promotion
Social Sol and Alianza Becerra and winners of Apertura and Clausura respectively, had to play a single match for the promotion to Honduran Liga Nacional.  Social Sol gained promotion after defeating Alianza Becerra in penalty shoot-outs after a 1–1 draw during 120 minutes of play.

References

2015–16 in Honduran football
Hon
Honduran Liga Nacional de Ascenso seasons